Money Creek is a stream in McLean County, Illinois, in the United States.

The origin of the name Money Creek is obscure. One tradition states a pioneer settler buried money there and died before it could be retrieved; another tradition states money was discovered there by Indians.

See also
List of rivers of Illinois

References

Rivers of McLean County, Illinois
Rivers of Illinois